Dainis Liepiņš (13 August 1962 – 27 November 2020) was a Soviet-Latvian cyclist.

He won several awards in "junior" categories in the early 1980s.

Awards
Winner of the 1979 Juniors Track World Championships Team Pursuit with Gaidis Liepiņš, Vladimir Baluk, and Yuri Petrov
Winner of the 1980 Juniors Track World Championships Team Pursuit with Andris Ločmelis, Martins Palejs, and Sergei Agupov
Silver Medal at the 1981 UCI Track Cycling World Championships for Amateur Individual Pursuit
2nd place in the 1981 Soviet Union Track Cycling Championships Team Pursuit with Vitaly Petrakov
3rd place in the 1981 Soviet Union Track Cycling Championships Individual Pursuit
3rd place in the 1982 Presidential Cycling Tour of Turkey
Bronze Medal at the 1983 UCI Track Cycling World Championships for Amateur Individual Pursuit
3rd place at the 1983 Soviet Union Track Cycling Championships Team Pursuit
3rd place in the 1983 Niedersachsen-Rundfahrt

References

1962 births
2020 deaths
Soviet male cyclists
Latvian male cyclists